Ettingshall Road railway station was a railway station built by the London and North Western Railway on their Stour Valley Line in 1852. It served the Ettingshall area of Wolverhampton, and was located near to the junction of Ettingshall Road and Parkfield Road.

It was sometimes known as Ettingshall Road and Bilston.

The station closed in 1964, although the Rugby-Birmingham-Stafford Line loop from the West Coast Main Line still runs through the site of the station.

References

Wolverhampton History and Heritage Society

Disused railway stations in Wolverhampton
Former London and North Western Railway stations
Railway stations in Great Britain opened in 1852
Railway stations in Great Britain closed in 1964
1852 establishments in England
Beeching closures in England